Eduard Bloch (30 January 1872 – 1 June 1945) was an Austrian physician practicing in Linz, who, for many years until 1907, was the family doctor of Adolf Hitler and his family. When Hitler's mother, Klara, was dying of breast cancer, Bloch billed the family at a reduced cost and sometimes refused to bill them outright. When the Nazis annexed Austria in 1938, Hitler awarded Bloch special protection and personally intervened to ensure his safety, as Bloch was an Austrian Jew. Following Kristallnacht and the escalation of anti-Jewish sentiment in Germany, Hitler allowed Bloch to emigrate to the United States, where he lived until his death in 1945, succumbing to stomach cancer.

Early life 
Bloch was born in Frauenberg (today Hluboká nad Vltavou, Czech Republic). He studied medicine in Prague at Charles University and then served as a medical officer in the Austrian army. He was stationed in Linz from 1899 until his discharge in 1901, at which point he opened a private doctor's practice there. His practice was in the baroque house at 12 Landstrasse, where he also lived with his family: his wife, Emilie (née Kafka) and their daughter Trude, born in 1903. According to Linz's future mayor Ernst Koref, Bloch was held in high regard, particularly among the lower and indigent social classes. It was generally known that at any time at night he was willing to call on patients. He used to go on visits in his hansom, wearing a conspicuous broad-brimmed hat. Like most Jews in Linz at the time, the Bloch family were assimilated.

Hitler family doctor
The first member of the Hitler family Bloch saw was Adolf. In 1904, Adolf Hitler had become seriously ill and was bedridden due to a serious lung ailment. Due to this, he was allowed to abandon his school career and return home. However, after checking Hitler's files, Bloch later maintained that he had treated the young man for only minor ailments—cold or tonsilitis—and that Hitler had been neither robust nor sickly. He also stated that Hitler did not have any illness whatsoever, let alone a lung disease.

In 1907, Hitler's mother, Klara Hitler, was diagnosed with breast cancer. She died on 21 December after intense suffering involving daily medication with iodoform, a foul-smelling and painful corrosive treatment typically used at the time and administered by Bloch. Because of the poor economic situation of the Hitler family, Bloch charged reduced prices, sometimes taking no fee at all. This showed in 1908, when Hitler wrote Bloch a postcard assuring him of his gratitude and reverence, which he expressed with handmade gifts, as for example a large wall painting, which according to Bloch's daughter Gertrude (Trude) Kren (born 1903 in Austria, died 1992 in the US) was lost in the course of time. Even in 1937, Hitler inquired about Bloch's well-being and called him an Edeljude ("noble Jew"). Bloch also apparently had a special fondness for the Hitler family, which may have saved his life.

Emigration
After Germany's annexation of Austria in March 1938 (Anschluss), life became harder for Austrian Jews. After Bloch's medical practice was closed on 1 October 1938, his daughter and son-in-law, Bloch's young colleague Franz Kren (born 1893 in Austria, died 1976 in the US), emigrated overseas.

The 66-year-old Bloch then wrote a letter to Hitler asking for help and was as a consequence put under special protection by the Gestapo. He was the only Jew in Linz with this status. Bloch stayed in his house with his wife undisturbed until the formalities for his emigration from the Third Reich and immigration to the United States were completed. Without any interference from the authorities, they were able to sell their family home at market value, highly unusual with the distress sales of emigrating Jews at the time and Nazi expropriation of Jewish assets through the Reich Flight Tax. Moreover, the Blochs were allowed to take the equivalent of 16 Reichsmark out of the country; the usual amount allowed to Jews was a mere 10 Reichsmark.

In 1940, Bloch immigrated to the US and settled in the Bronx, 2755 Creston Avenue, New York City but was no longer able to practice medicine because his medical degree from Austria-Hungary was not recognised. He died of stomach cancer in 1945 at age 73, barely a month after Hitler's death. He is buried in Beth David Cemetery, Section D, Block 3, Elmont, New York.

Interviews and memoirs
In 1941 and 1943, Bloch was interviewed by the Office of Strategic Services (a predecessor of the Central Intelligence Agency) to gain information about Hitler's childhood.

He also published his memories about the encounter with the later "Führer" in the Collier's Weekly: As a youth he was quiet, well mannered and neatly dressed. He waited patiently in the waiting room until it was his turn, then like every 14- or 15-year old boy, bowed as a sign of respect, and always thanked the doctor politely. Like many other youngsters of Linz, he wore short lederhosen and a green woolen hat with a feather. He was tall and pale and looked older than his age. His eyes which he inherited from his mother were large, melancholic and thoughtful. To a very large extent, this boy lived within himself. What dreams he dreamt I do not know.

Bloch also said that Hitler's most striking feature was his love for his mother: While Hitler was not a mother's boy in the usual sense, I never witnessed a closer attachment. Their love had been mutual. Klara Hitler adored her son. She allowed him his own way whenever possible. For example, she admired his watercolor paintings and drawings and supported his artistic ambitions in opposition to his father at what cost to herself one may guess. However, Bloch expressly denies the claim that Hitler's love for his mother was pathological.

In his memory, Hitler was the "saddest man I had ever seen" when he was informed about his mother's imminent death. He remembered Klara Hitler as a very "pious and kind" woman. According to Bloch, after Alois Hitler's death, the family's financial resources were scarce. He mentioned that Klara Hitler had lived frugally and had not indulged in even the smallest extravagance.

Works about Bloch
Despite the obvious affection Hitler showed to Bloch, historian Rudolph Binion believes that he was one of the contributing factors to Hitler's antisemitism that later resulted in the Holocaust. Historian Brigitte Hamann takes the opposite view, arguing that Hitler's antisemitism coalesced later, after Hitler's years in Vienna.

Among the other acquaintances of Bloch was Hedda Wagner, an author and supporter of women's rights, who wrote a book dedicated to him. Writer Jay Neugeboren set his novel 1940 in the Bronx and focuses on events surrounding Eduard Bloch.

See also
Hugo Gutmann

References

Sources 
 Eduard Bloch: "My Patient Hitler". In: Collier’s Weekly, March 15 and March 22, 1941.
 Eduard Bloch: The Autobiography of Obermedizinalrat Eduard Bloch. In: J. A. S. Grenville and Raphael Gross (Eds.): The Leo Baeck Institute Year Book, XLVII (2002)
 Office of Strategic Services, Hitler Source Book, Interview With Dr. Eduard Bloch March 5, 1943
 Hamann, Brigitte Hitler's Vienna: A Dictator's Apprenticeship. Oxford University Press, 1999. 

1872 births
1945 deaths
People from Hluboká nad Vltavou
People from the Kingdom of Bohemia
Austro-Hungarian Jews
19th-century Austrian physicians
20th-century Austrian physicians
Jewish emigrants from Austria to the United States after the Anschluss
American people of Czech-Jewish descent
Burials at Beth David Cemetery
Austrian general practitioners
Deaths from stomach cancer
Deaths from cancer in New York (state)
Charles University alumni